The Australasian Association for Theatre, Drama and Performance Studies (ADSA), formerly the Australian Drama Studies Association, is an academic association promoting the study of theatre in New Zealand and Australia.

History 
The Australian Drama Studies Association was established in 1977 by Philip Parsons  (1926–1993), an academic in drama based at the University of New South Wales, known also for being a co-founder of the performing arts publishing company Currency Press. 

The association changed its name in 1993, but kept the abbreviation of ADSA.

Publications and conferences 

ADSA publishes a peer-reviewed journal, Australian Drama Studies, established in 1982. It also holds an annual conference.

Awards

ADSA awards a number of prizes, as well as life memberships. Notable life members include Lisa Warrington, Katharine Brisbane, Gareth Griffiths, and David O’Donnell.

Awards include:
 Marlis Thiersch Prize – "for research excellence in an English-language article or book chapter published anywhere in the world in the broad field of theatre and performance studies"
 Rob Jordan Prize – for "the best book on a theatre, drama or performance studies related subject published in the previous two years"
 Joanne Tompkins Prize – for "excellence in book and journal editing", once every four years, starting in 2017
 Peta Tait Prize – for "excellence in creative projects and scholarship achievement over time".
 Flinders University AusStage Prize – "to recognise research excellence that utilises AusStage in articles, books, and non-traditional digital outputs"

Philip Parsons Prize

The  Philip Parsons Prize for Performance as Research is "an annual Philip Parsons Prize for a senior student (honours or postgraduate) undertaking a Performance As Research (PAR) project". The inaugural award was given in 1995, but it has not been awarded every year since then. Prizewinners include:

 2021 Michael Metzger (New Zealand)
 2019 Margi Brown Ash (Griffith University) 
 2018 Alex Tálamo (University of New South Wales)
 2017 Lynne Bradley (Queensland University of Technology) and David Joseph (University of New England) (joint winners)
 2016 Suzie J. Jarmain (University of New England)
 2015 Natasha Budd (Queensland University of Technology) 
 2014 Emily O'Connor (University of New South Wales)
 2013 Teresa Izzard (Curtin University)
 2011 Rachel Swain (Melbourne University)
 2009 Ben Knapton (Queensland University of Technology) 
 2008 Leah Mercer (Queensland University of Technology) 
 2007 David Fenton (Queensland University of Technology)
 2005 Liza-Mare Syron (University of Wollongong)
 2004 Julie Robson (Queensland University of Technology) 
 2003 Amanda Lynch and Neal Harvey (University of Queensland)
 2000 Michael Noble (Murdoch University) 
 1998 Sandra d'Urso (La Trobe)
 1997 Cracka Theatre Company (University of Queensland) 
 1996 Stacey Callaghan (University of New England) 
 1995 Tim Benzie (University of Queensland)

References

External links

Australian performing arts awards
Performing arts education in Australia
1977 establishments in Australia